Vikki Petraitis (born 1965) is an Australian true crime author, based in Melbourne, Victoria.

Media 
Petraitis regularly speaks on the Australian True Crime podcast hosted by Meshel Laurie and Emily Webb. In September 2019, Petraitis was interviewed by Casefile for their From the Files podcast titled From Frankston to Philip Island. She was also instrumental in creating The Vanishing of Vivienne Cameron – a 10-episode Australian crime podcast series released in 2020 covering the case. In 2021, she also created and narrated a 9-episode podcast on the disappearance of Sarah Macdiarmid.

Awards 
Petraitis was nominated for the 2007 Sisters in Crime Davitt Award for her book Forensics. In 2007, she won the Scarlet Stiletto Award for Best New Talent for a fiction piece she wrote called "Side Window".

Books 
 The Phillip Island Murder – the true account of a brutal killing (with Paul Daley), 1993, Kerr Publishing 
 Victims, Crimes and Investigators, 1995, Victoria Press
 The Frankston Murders – the true story of serial killer, Paul Denyer, 1995, Nivar Press 
 The Great John Coleman (with Wayne Miller), 1998, Nivar Press 
 Rockspider – the danger of paedophiles – untold stories, (with Chris O’Connor), April 2000, Hybrid Publishers 
 On Murder II – (chapter: Serial Killers are Losers) Edited by Kerry Greenwood, Black Inc, 2002
 Cops – True stories from Australian Police, 2005, The Five Mile Press 
 Forensics – true stories from Australian Police Files, 2006, The Five Mile Press 
 "The Frankston Murders and The Paedophile Witch" in Outside the Law, 2008, The Five Mile Press
Crime Scene Investigations – more stories from the Australian Police Files, 2008, The Five Mile Press 
Salvation – the true story of Rod Braybon's fight for justice, 2009, Jewel Publishing 
The Russell Street Bombing, 2013,  Clan Destine Press 
The Dog Squad – incredible true stories of courageous police dogs and their handlers, 2015, Michael Joseph, 
Once a Copper: The life and times of Brian "The Skull" Murphy, 2018, Wild Dingo Press 
The Frankston Murders: 25 Years On, 2018
Inside the Law: 25 Years of True Crime Writing, 2019, Clan Destine Press 
Cops, drugs, Lawyer X and me (with Paul Dale), 2020, Hachette Australia

References

External links 
 Author profile Five Mile Press
 OzLit Editorial

Living people
1965 births
Australian non-fiction crime writers
Australian non-fiction writers
People associated with true crime
Scarlet Stiletto award winners
Writers from Melbourne
Women crime writers